Jalgaon is a village in Rahata taluka of Ahmednagar district in Indian state of Maharashtra.

Demographics
As per 2011 census, population of Jalgaon is 3508 of which 1800 are male and 1708 are female.

Transport

Road
Jalgaon is connected to Puntamba, Chitali and Wakadi by village road.

Rail
Chitali and Puntamba are the nearest railway station to the village.

Air
Shirdi Airport is nearest airport the village.

See also
List of villages in Rahata taluka

References 

Maharashtra